Zhang Dapeng (Chinese: 張大鵬, 1754 – 12 March 1815), also known as Saint Joseph Zhang Dapeng, was a Chinese martyr.

Life
Zhang Dapeng was born in 1754 as a Buddhist in Guizhou. He was a silkmaker by trade and operated a business with a partner that was surnamed Wang. His partner's son Wang Zheng, was sent to attend examinations in Beijing. While Wang Zheng was there, he encountered the Catholic Church in Beijing, converted and was baptized. Wang Zheng then began trying to convert others to the faith and when he returned home to Guizhou, he also tried to convert his family there.

Zhang Dapeng did not want to convert, however. He had married a wife named Chen Shi, but after many years, she had not provided him with a son, so he had taken a concubine as a second wife to produce a child. He then had a son with his second wife named Zhang Dewang who was born in 1793. Conversion to Christianity would have required him to only have one wife, and because his first wife was seen to be the proper wife and the second wife had the status of a concubine, it would have meant that the mother of his only son had to leave him.

A Chinese priest named Luo Madi was doing missionary efforts in neighbouring Sichuan at that time and he sent a Chinese lay missionary named Hu Shilu (胡世禄 - baptismal name was Lawrence) to go to Guizhou to preach the faith and establish a mission there.

Hu Shilu encountered Zhang Dapeng and managed to convince him to change his mind about accepting the faith. Zhang Dapeng then agree to send his concubine away. He paid a dowry for her to be married to a Catholic layman that was surnamed Du, and then he began religious instructions to join the Catholic Church. One of his fellow catechumens in the same class was the future Chinese martyr saint Wu Guosheng (吴国盛 - baptismal name was Peter, also called Peter Wu).

He was baptized in the year 1800 baptized at the age 46 by \Luo Madi. After the baptism, he started to preach the word of the Roman Catholic Church. He taught over a thousand people to accept Catholicism. He also sometimes helped in doing service for poor elderly people and orphans.

He also spent three years working as a headmaster and teacher at a Catholic school that was set up by a missionary in Guiyang.

Some of his relatives were angry at his attempts to proselytize and they made false accusations against him to the government that he was a member of the White Lotus Society that had been conspiring against the Qing dynasty.

His wife and son eventually joined the faith after he had and were baptized too. His son took the baptismal name of Anthony.

Because of his preaching, the Mandarins wanted to imprison him because some of the local Chinese disliked foreign religious beliefs. This also coincided with the new wave of persecution initiated by the Jiaqing Emperor in the 1810s against Christians in China. Soon, his son was captured by the Mandarins and died in 1813.

Zhang Dapeng heard of his son's death and fled to Sichuan. His brother-in-law betrayed him to the authorities for a monetary reward and then Zhang Dapeng was captured and was imprisoned in the year 1814. He was put into the same prison that was holding Wu Guosheng and other Christians arrested for the faith. They were presented with a crucifix and told to trample on it, but Zhang Dapeng refused.

Zhang Dapeng's nephew offered to pay him a large sum of money if he would renounce Christ, but Zhang Dapeng still refused, saying  'What use is silver to me? You can buy my body, but you can't buy my soul.'

The officials judged Zhang Dapeng as guilty of violating the law by following an evil cult and working to spread it to others.

Zhang Dapeng was ordered to be executed. His relatives still tried to call for him to give up the faith while there was still time, but he refused.

He was tied to a crucifix shaped like a capital letter T and the executioner used a rope around his neck to strangle him to death.

On 12 March 1815, Zhang Dapeng was killed by the Mandarins at the age of 61.

A big storm started after he died, which was interpreted as an omen by people that were there. People in later times would go to his gravesite to collect plants for medicine and they believed these plants had special healing properties.

Family life
Zhang Dapeng had two wives and a son named Dewang Dapeng. Zhang Dapeng also had two brothers named Dakui and Daxue.

Canonization 
Zhang Dapeng was beatified on 12 February 1909 by Pope Pius X and was canonized on October 1 of 2000 by Pope John Paul II.

Chapel
Hong Kong St. Zhang Dapeng Chapel

See also
Chinese Martyrs

References

19th-century Roman Catholic martyrs
Converts to Roman Catholicism from Buddhism
Chinese Roman Catholic saints
Executed Qing dynasty people
People executed by the Qing dynasty
1754 births
1815 deaths
Chinese merchants
Businesspeople from Guizhou
People from Qiannan
People executed by strangulation
19th-century executions by China
Executed people from Guizhou
18th-century Chinese businesspeople
19th-century Chinese businesspeople